Christopher Cook (born 1959) is a British painter known for works since 1998 in graphite powder and resin, which have been exhibited in, and collected by, several major museums, predominantly in the USA.

Work 

Cook’s works since 1998/9 have been almost exclusively monochromatic, painted and drawn in graphite powder suspended in resin and oil, onto coated papers, aluminium sheet, or linen. The surfaces of what he terms ‘graphites’ are extremely thin, and involve much reworking but almost no layering. The images have considerable range in terms of subject matter. Formal connections to Daguerreotype, Photorealism, lithography and Surrealism have been noted in reviews
 
In some works, especially those arising from an Arts Council residency at Eden Project,
there is a strongly microscopic component, emphasized by the intricacy of the graphite surfaces, and sometimes linked to Baroque architecture.
 
Cook is represented by Mary Ryan Gallery, New York.  He is also a writer, and has published a number of artist books and collections of poems, and has also contributed catalogue essays,
exhibition and book reviews.

Career 

Studied:
1979-81 BA English Literature & Fine Art, Exeter University (University poetry prize).
1983-86 MA Painting, Royal College of Art.
 
First solo show at Camden Arts Centre in 1985. Awarded Italian Government scholarship in 1986 and moved to Italy for three years. During this time his strongly coloured, symbolic work received curatorial attention, and was included in the exhibitions Eros in Albion at the Casa Massaccio, and in da Bacon a oggi, Palazzo Vecchio Florence.
 
In 1991/2 he was Guest Artist to the Stadelschule
Frankfurt-am-Main, Germany, and the following year was Visiting Fellow at Ruskin School, Oxford University. In 1994/5 he was Distinguished Visiting Artist to California State University, Long Beach, USA. 
 
From 1995-97 he made three extended visits to India, working mainly on texts, sand drawings and an artist’s book. On returning to the UK he made the first of his monochromatic ‘graphites’, and has rarely used colour since. He attributes the change to experiences in India, the influence of the sand drawings, and the benefits of grayscale to the imagination. He has lectured extensively in the UK, the USA, and the Netherlands. In 1998 he was appointed Reader in Painting at the University of Plymouth
 
A graphite was selected for John Moores 2014, and another was a prizewinner at John Moores 21. In 2017 he was first prizewinner (Valeria Sykes Award) in the biennial New Light exhibition, touring four venues in the UK. In 2019 he won the Sunny Art Prize, London/Shanghai.

Exhibitions 

Solo shows (graphite works) 
 2019 York Art Gallery, as part of "Making a Masterpiece: Bouts and Beyond
 2018 Ryan Lee Gallery New York  https://ryanleegallery.com/exhibitions/christopher-cook-shadows-we-run-for/
 2018 Shandong University, China
 2015 Huebner and Huebner; Frankfurt-am-Main Germany. http://www.galerie-huebner.de/
 2014 Art First London http://www.artfirst.co.uk/christopher_cook/pe-14.html 
 2013 Ryan Lee New York
 2011 Langgeng Foundation, Jogjakarta, Indonesia http://www.langgengfoundation.org/christopher-cook-visiting-artist-from-the-fine-art-society-of-london/ 
 2009 Fine Art Society London 
 2008 Mary Ryan Gallery https://web.archive.org/web/20160303223841/http://www.allartnews.com/liquid-graphite-works-by-christopher-cook-at-mary-ryan-gallery/ 
 2007 Today Art Museum, Beijing http://art.china.cn/zixun/2007-04/06/content_1545088.htm 
 2005 Yokohama Museum of Art, Japan https://archive.today/20141206131014/http://www.cookgraphites.com/pages/texts/tadeshi_kawamata.htm 
 2004 Art Museum, University of Memphis, USA https://web.archive.org/web/20141111074312/http://www.memphis.edu/amum/exhibitions/exhibits_past.php 
 2003 Eden Project, Cornwall, UK http://www.edenproject.com/ 
 2001 Ferens Museum, Hull, UK. Towner Gallery, Eastborne.
 2000 Heidelberger Kunstverein, Germany http://collections.britishart.yale.edu/vufind/Record/2061177 
 
Selected group exhibitions (graphite works): 
 
 2018 Layers of Visibility, NiMAC Nicosia . http://nimac.org.cy/en-gb/exhibitions/exhibition/layers-of-visibility
 2017 A Different Way of Painting, curated by Tony Godfrey, Langgeng Foundation Yogyakarta, Indonesia 
 2014: John Moores Liverpool;
 2012: Graphite, GV Art London https://web.archive.org/web/20160304065632/http://www.gvart.co.uk/wp-content/uploads/2012/10/GV-Art-Graphite-Catalogue.pdf ; Amalgam, Mary Ryan Gallery, New York;
 2011: ICA Singapore; Drawings for the New Century, Minneapolis Museum of Art USA; Grey, Fitzwilliam Museum Cambridge https://web.archive.org/web/20150910084004/http://www.fitzmuseum.cam.ac.uk/whatson/exhibitions/article.html?3097 ;
 2010: Dust on the Mirror, Djanogly Gallery, Nottingham UK. http://www.lakesidearts.org.uk/Exhibitions/ViewEvent.html?e=1628&c=5&d=0 
 2009: Leaded, Salina Art Gallery, Kansas, USA https://web.archive.org/web/20150908105943/http://museums.richmond.edu/exhibitions/museum-of-art/leaded.html 
 2006: Until it Makes Sense, Gallery Seventeen, London; Thaddeus Ropac Gallery, Paris;
 2005: Yale Center for British Art USA; Cleveland Museum USA; 2003: East of Eden Spacex Gallery Exeter;

Collections 

Allen Memorial Art Museum, USA;
British Museum, UK;
Bundanon Trust, Australia; 
Cleveland Museum USA; 
Contemporary Arts Society UK; 
Fitzwilliam Museum Cambridge UK;
Haugesund Art Gallery Norway; 
Hereford Museum, UK; 
Metropolitan Museum New York USA; 
Minneapolis Institute of Art USA; 
MIMA, Middlesbrough, UK; 
Today Art Museum Beijing, China; 
University of Exeter, UK; 
Yale Center for British Art, USA; 
Yokohama Museum of Art, Japan;

Recent Awards 

 2001 Arts Council England Residency, Eden Project Cornwall UK 
 2005 Daiwa Award, Yokohama Triennial
 2005 AHRC award, Yokohama Triennial 
 2006 British Council Award, Beijing
 2011 Residency, Langgeng Foundation, Jogjakarta, Indonesia
 2013 Bogliasco Foundation Scholarship, Italy https://www.bfny.org/
 2017 Nicosia Municipal Art Gallery Residency
 2017 New Light Exhibition First Prizewinner (Valeria Sykes Award)
 2019 Sunny Art Prize, First Prizewinner London/Shanghai

References

Sources/external links 
 http://www.christophercook.cc/
 http://www.plymouth.ac.uk/pages/view.asp?page=18656
 http://www.artfirst.co.uk/ 
 http://www.absolutearts.com/artsnews/2001/10/17/29254.html 
 http://www.artinamericamagazine.com/exhibitions/christopher-cook/
 http://ryanleegallery.com/
 http://newlight-art.org.uk/yorkshire-born-artist-comes-full-circle-to-win-major-award/

British painters
British male painters
1959 births
Living people